Raquette, Rackete, or Rakete may refer to:

Places
Raquette Lake, the source of the Raquette River
Raquette Lake, New York, a community in the Town of Long Lake in Hamilton County
Raquette River, a tributary of the Saint Lawrence River located entirely in New York state

People
Gösta Raquette or Gustaf Rikard Raquette (also spelled Gustav) (1871–1945), missionary with the Mission Covenant Church of Sweden
Carola Rackete, a German sea captain and human rights activist
Jim Rakete, a German photographer